Bajbuza is a Polish coat of arms. It was used by several szlachta families in the times of the Polish–Lithuanian Commonwealth.

History

Blazon

Notable bearers
Notable bearers of this coat of arms include:

Notes

See also
 Polish heraldry
 Heraldic family
 List of Polish nobility coats of arms

Bibliography
 http://pl.wikisource.org/wiki/Encyklopedia_staropolska/Bajbuza

Polish coats of arms